Magwi is a town in South Sudan

Location
The town is located in Magwi County, Eastern Equatoria State in southern South Sudan, near the border with the Republic of Uganda. The coordinates of the town of Magwi are:4° 08' 0.00"N, 32° 18' 0.00"E (Latitude:4.1300; Longitude:32.300).

Overview
Magwi is the headquarters of Magwi Payam, in which it lies. It is also the administrative capital of Magwi County. On 22 June 2011, construction began on the building that will house Magwi County Headquarters. The town is also home to the Rural Youth's Voices Project, a community-based youth radio station and music production studio. The station lets people in the community exchange information, opinions, and experience.
Magwi Central Primary School, located in Magwi town, has eighteen (18) paid teachers and six (6) volunteers. The student body in 2010 was 1,157 boys and 847 girls. One hundred forty-nine (149) of the children were orphans. As of 2010 the school had no buildings but conducted classes under trees.

According to the Statistical Yearbook of South Sudan 2010, the population of Magwi is 41,778.

Points of interest
The following points of interest are found in the town of Magwi:
 The offices of Magwi Town Council
 The headquarters of Magwi Payam
 The headquarters of Magwi County Administration
 Magwi Airport - A civilian airport to the southeast of Magwi's central business district
 Magwi Central Primary School - A public,  mixed, non-residential, elementary school with nearly 2,000 students in 2010.

See also
 Eastern Equatoria
 Equatoria

References

External links
Location of Magwi At Google Maps

Populated places in Eastern Equatoria
Equatoria